Linda Molin (born 24 July 1992) is a Swedish actress. She is best known for her performance as Kristin in Bitch Hug which got her a nomination for the Guldbagge Award for Best Actress in a Leading Role.

References

External links 

1992 births
Living people
Swedish film actresses
People from Gothenburg